Alex Quaison-Sackey (9 August 1924 – 21 December 1992) was a Ghanaian diplomat who served during the first and third republics. He was the first black African to serve as president of the United Nations General Assembly.

Early life and education
Quaison-Sackey was born at Winneba in the Central Region of Ghana. He received his secondary education in Ghana at Mfantsipim School at Cape Coast in the Central Region and studied at the Intermediate Department at Achimota College near Accra. He then proceeded to the United Kingdom, where he studied Philosophy, Politics and Economics at Exeter College, Oxford University, graduating with an honours degree. He also studied international relations and international law at the London School of Economics after being appointed one of Ghana's first Foreign Service officers.

Diplomatic service
He served as Ghana's second ambassador and permanent representative to the United Nations from 30 June 1959 to 1965. He served as President of the United Nations General Assembly from 1964 to 1965, becoming the first black African to hold that position. During that time, Quaison-Sackey was also Ghana's ambassador to Cuba from 1961 to 1965 and ambassador to Mexico from 1962 to 1964. In 1965, he became foreign minister of Ghana, but served in that position for only a few months, as he was dismissed when President Nkrumah was overthrown in February 1966. He was again appointed as Ambassador to the United States in 1978 by the Supreme Military Council led by Lt. General Fred Akuffo.

Politics
Quaison-Sackey was appointed as Minister for Foreign Affairs in Kwame Nkrumah's Convention People's Party government. He was on a trip to North Vietnam with Nkrumah when the government was overthrown by a military coup d'état leading to the formation of the National Liberation Council on 24 February 1966 led by Lt. General Joseph Arthur Ankrah.

Death
Quaison-Sackey died aged 68 at Korle Bu Teaching Hospital in Accra, following a pulmonary embolism on 21 December 1992.

Family
Quaison-Sackey's parents were Alex Emmanuel Sackey (1902–1972) and Alberta Quaison. He married Elsie Annie Blankson (1927–2003). Together, they had six children – the late Egya, the late Nana, Awo, Kweku Bondzie, Nenyi (Nii) and Yaaba. Their grandchildren are Kwesi Awenate, Kodwo, Nana, Egya, Selassie and Sena.

Publications
Quaison-Sackey later wrote about his experiences of diplomatic issues in Ghana's early days in a book called Africa Unbound: Reflections of an African Statesman, which was published by Praeger in May 1963. In it he describes his concept of "Negritude" - "Acceptance and affirmation of the quality of blackness. It is a psychological gathering together of all black peoples in the spiritual bonds of brotherhood."

References

1924 births
1992 deaths
Foreign ministers of Ghana
Ambassadors of Ghana to Cuba
Ambassadors of Ghana to the United States
Ambassadors of Ghana to Mexico
Presidents of the United Nations General Assembly
Alumni of Achimota School
Mfantsipim School alumni
Alumni of the London School of Economics
Alumni of Exeter College, Oxford
Permanent Representatives of Ghana to the United Nations
Convention People's Party (Ghana) politicians